The women's 4 × 100 metre freestyle relay event at the 2016 Summer Olympics took place on 6 August at the Olympic Aquatics Stadium.

Summary
As expected, the Australian women's team solidified its triumph to set a new world record and defend the Olympic title in one of the program's freestyle relay races with the help of sterling final legs from sisters Bronte and Cate Campbell. Trailing half of the race with a marginal lead from the Americans, Bronte booted the Australians to the front with a third-leg split of 52.15, before her sister Cate (51.97) put on a fastest finish at the anchor leg to deliver the foursome of Emma McKeon (53.41) and Brittany Elmslie (53.12) a gold-medal time in 3:30.65. Moreover, they managed to break their own world record, set at the Commonwealth Games two years earlier, by a third of a second (3:30.98).

The U.S. team of Simone Manuel (53.36) and Abbey Weitzeil (52.56) handed Dana Vollmer the third-leg duties to maintain their lead, but Vollmer's split of 53.18 was just almost a second behind Bronte Campbell that pushed Australia to the front. As Katie Ledecky dove into the pool at the final exchange with a split of 52.79, she could not catch Cate Campbell near the wall to leave the Americans with a silver medal in 3:31.89. Meanwhile, Sandrine Mainville (53.86), Chantal Van Landeghem (53.12), Taylor Ruck (53.19), and Penny Oleksiak (52.72) ended Canada's 20-year medal drought for the female swimmers by taking home the bronze in 3:32.89.

The Dutch quartet of Marrit Steenbergen (54.29), Femke Heemskerk (53.47), Inge Dekker (53.85), and three-time gold medalist Ranomi Kromowidjojo (52.20) fell short of the medal podium with a fourth-place time in 3:33.81, while Sweden (3:35.90), Italy (3:36.78), France (3:37.45), and Japan (3:37.78) also vied for an Olympic medal.

Earlier in the prelims, the Australian team of Elmslie (53.22), Campbell sisters Bronte (53.26) and Cate (51.80), and Madison Wilson (54.11) grabbed the top seed with a 3:32.39 to overturn their own existing Olympic record by 86-hundredths of a second.

The medals were presented by John Dowling Coates, Australia Vice President of the IOC and Dennis Miller, Vice President of FINA.

Records
Prior to this competition, the existing world and Olympic records were as follows.

The following records were established during the competition:

Competition format

The competition consisted of two rounds: heats and a final. The relay teams with the best 8 times in the heats advanced to the final. Swim-offs were used as necessary to break ties for advancement to the next round.

Results

Heats
A total of sixteen countries have qualified to participate. The best eight from two heats advanced to the final.

Final

References

Women's 4 x 100 metre freestyle relay
Olympics
2016 in women's swimming
Women's events at the 2016 Summer Olympics